APFT may refer to:
 The Asia Pacific Flight Training Academy in Kota Bharu, Kelantan, Malaysia
 The United States Army Physical Fitness Test, designed to test the muscular strength, endurance, and cardiovascular respiratory physical fitness of soldiers.